The Zürichsee-Schifffahrtsgesellschaft or Lake Zürich Navigation Company (commonly abbreviated to ZSG) is a public Swiss company operating passenger ships and boats on Lake Zürich.

The company operates services connecting lake-side towns between Zürich and Rapperswil, as well as more tourist oriented cruises and boat services on the Limmat through the centre of the city of Zürich. It is a member of the Zürich Public Transport Network (ZVV) and transports over 1,5 million passengers every year.

The ZSG is a joint stock company with a share capital of 11 million Swiss Francs (CHF). The share capital – one third is in private hands – is divided into 110,000 bearer shares, each with a nominal value of CHF 100.

History 

Steam navigation started on Lake Zürich in 1834, when Franz Carl Caspar and Johann Jakob Lämmlin founded a new company (Caspar und Lämmlin, Unternehmer der Dampfschiffahrt auf dem Zürcher- und Walensee) and ordered their first ship from William Fairbairn of Manchester, England.  entered service the following year. When the cuty fortifications were abolished, the then called Bauschänzli bastion remained intact, and served from 1835 to 1883 as the landing site for the first steamboats on the lake, later provided by the Zürichsee-Schifffahrtsgesellschaft.

Over the years, various other companies started operating steam ships on the lake, and various mergers took place, until the entire fleet was taken over by the Swiss Northeastern Railway (NOB) in 1874. The NOB also owned most of the railway network around the lake, and this monopoly led to consumer resistance, and to the formation of the Zürcher Dampfbootgesellschaft (Zürich Steamship Company) in 1890/91. In order to operate a tram-like suburban traffic, a series of nine screw steamships was ordered.

When the NOB became part of the Swiss Federal Railways in 1903, the Zürcher Dampfbootgesellschaft took over its fleet of ships on Lake Zürich. This included the large paddle steamer Helvetia. In 1909 and 1914, it ordered two further large paddle steamers, which were to become today's Stadt Zürich and Stadt Rapperswil respectively. In 1934 the Zürcher Dampfbootgesellschaft introduced its first successful motor ship, the Etzel, and from then on the fleet became increasingly motorized.

For the Swiss National Exhibition of 1939, four sister motor ships, the Taucherli, Schwan, Möve and Ente, were brought into service. These vessels provided a connecting service between the two exhibition sites, at Wollishofen and Zürichhorn. The second world war brought economic difficulties, but the cross-lake services were maintained.  As a consequence of the transition from steam power to motor vessels, the company changed its name to Zürichsee Schifffahrtgesellschaft, or ZSG for short, in 1957.

In 1990, the ZSG became part of the Zürcher Verkehrsverbund (ZVV), the public transport network established in the same year, accepting the ZVVs common tickets and tariffs.

In 2009 there was a centennial exhibition on board Stadt Zürich at Zürich-Bürkliplatz. On 12 June 2009, exactly 100 years after the maiden voyage of the steamship Stadt Zürich, its anniversary trip with invited guests and its sistership Stadt Rapperswil was celebrated., and in 2014 for its then 100 years aged sistership.

Fleet

Current fleet 
A fleet of 17 passenger ships, including two historical paddle steamers – Stadt Zürich (built in 1909) and Stadt Rapperwil (1914) – and 15 motor vessels of various sizes is operated by the Zürichsee-Schifffahrtsgesellschaft. ZSG's flagship MS Helvetia has a capacity of 1200 passengers. The fleet includes three small Limmat boats for round trips on the Limmat and on the lower  Lake Zürich at Zürich.

Former fleet 
The paddle steamer Helvetia, built in 1875 and last operated in 1958, was scrapped in 1964. Of the four so-called Landi-Boote built for the Swiss national exposition ("Landi") of 1939, Ente was sold to the BLS after the exhibition, whilst Schwan (renamed Halbinsel Au), Möve and Taucherli (renamed Speer) continued in service until the end of the 1990s, when they were replaced by three motor ships (300 passengers each) of the Albis type – Albis, Pfannenstiel and Uetliberg – in addition to two smaller (150 passengers each) motor ships – Zimmerberg and Forch.

Operations 

The ZSG operates regular round trips from its main Zürich landing point at Bürklipatz. In summer, trips taking 4 hours operate every hour and stop on both shores of the lower lake at Zürichhorn, Wollishofen, Kilchberg-Bendlikon, Küsnacht-Heslibach, Küsnacht, Zollikon, Meilen, Herrliberg, Rüschlikon, Thalwil, Erlenbach, Oberrieden, Horgen, Au peninsula, Wädenswil, Richterswil, Stäfa, Männedorf, Ufenau island and Rapperswil. A few trips continue through the Hurden ship canal to the upper lake, or Obersee, calling at Altendorf, Lachen and Schmerikon, and take 7 hours.

There also are shorter round trips from Zürich-Bürkliplatz, with 2.5 hour trips as far as Richterswil or Stäfa, and 1.5 hour trips to Erlenbach and Thalwil.

The company also operates services on the Limmat through the centre of Zürich. These services operate upriver from the Landesmuseum via Limmatquai and Storchen to Lake Zürich, stopping at Bürkliplatz, Enge and Zürichhorn, before returning downriver to the Landesmuseum. Because of the low bridges over the Limmat in central Zurich, these services use low profile motor boats.

The ZSG employs approximatively 80 permanent members of staff, and in the main summer season (April–December) five additional nautical seasonal workers, as well as seven staff in the ticket office at Zürich Bürkliplatz. In its own ship yard at Zürich-Wollishofen work qualified carpenters, painters, mechanics, electricians, plumbers and locksmiths.

See also

 Zürichsee-Fähre Horgen–Meilen, the main car ferry operator on Lake Zürich

References

External links

 Zürichsee Schifffahrtsgesellschaft web site (English language subset) 
 History of the Zürichsee Schifffahrtsgesellschaft web site (English language subset) 
 Zürichsee Schifffahrtsgesellschaft web site (full German language version)

Companies based in Zürich
Transport companies established in 1891
Ferry transport in Switzerland
Lake Zurich
Limmat
Paddle steamers
Shipping companies of Switzerland
Transport in the canton of St. Gallen
Transport in the canton of Schwyz
Transport in the canton of Zürich
Transport in Zürich
Swiss companies established in 1891